Astrid Lindgren's World is a theme park located in Astrid Lindgren's native city Vimmerby, Sweden.

It was opened in 1981 as a Fairytale Village (Sagobyn). In 1981, they built Katthult. the first house together on a 1:3 scale. Over the years, more settings were added all built on a 1:3 scale.

In its 180,000 square metres, visitors meet all the beloved characters from books by Astrid Lindgren. All the environments are built as prescribed in the books and they give child visitors the possibility to enter into the stories of Pippi Longstocking, Emil i Lönneberga, Karlsson-on-the-Roof, and many others of Astrid Lindgren's beloved characters.

Astrid Lindgrens World is open in the summer from May to August. During the summer season events go on all day long, both on stage and improvised all around the park. The small stage just inside the entrance and the main stage shows every day special written scenes with music that includes singing and dancing. There are various performances by the characters including Pippi at her home, Villa Villekulla.

Meeting with the environments and the interaction with the well-known characters form an important part of the offering. Besides the theme park, Astrid Lindgren's World also offers its visitors many different types of lodging options and a wide selection of places for picnics, coffeehouse and restaurant visits.

Gallery

References

External links 

 Astrid Lindgrens värld) Official Site
The Astrid Lindgren Company website
 The wild world of Pippi Longstocking

Amusement parks in Sweden
Buildings and structures in Kalmar County
Astrid Lindgren
Tourist attractions in Kalmar County
1981 establishments in Sweden
Amusement parks opened in 1981